Shahrak-e Emam Khomeyni (also Romanized as Shahrak-e Emām Khomeynī; also known as Shahrak-e ‘Alīābād) is a village in Mirbag-e Shomali Rural District, in the Central District of Delfan County, Lorestan Province, Iran. At the 2006 census, its population was 1,409, in 335 families.

References 

Towns and villages in Delfan County